The Administrative Department of Sport, Recreation, Physical Activity and the Use of Free Time, Coldeportes was the national government department of sports in and for Colombia; it is charged with fomenting, planning and organizing the activities of sport and physical education.

References 

Government agencies established in 2011
Administrative departments of Colombia
Sport in Colombia
Sports governing bodies in Colombia